Fatima Adoum is a French actress based in London and Paris.

Biography 
She studied language sciences, performing arts and holds a PhD in Cinema – at La Sorbonne, Paris 1.

Filmography

Cinema 

 2002: Irréversible de Gaspar Noé
 2002: Funeral, Newton I. Aduaka
 2004: Les Anges malicieux, Frédéric Monpierre
 2004: Wild Side, Sébastien Lifshitz 
 2005: Temps morts, Eléonore Weber
 2008: La Louve, Bruno Bontzolakis
 2009: Benicio, Eric Borg 
 2010: Infantania, Eric Borg 
 2010: One Man's Show, Newton I. Aduaka
 2010: Stabat mater, Jean-Luc Herbulot
 2010: À tout prix, Yann Danh
 2010: Lili's Got Talent, Nur Sadiq 
 2011: L'Assaut Julien Leclercq 
 2011: Sherlock Holmes: A Game of Shadows, Guy Ritchie
 2012: Judy and Jim, Ben Fellows
 2012: A Place in the Sun, Peter Flinth
 2013: Un p'tit gars de Ménilmontant, Alain Minier
 2013: Munster cake, Jean-Luc Herbulot
 2013: The Mark of the Angels – Miserere, Sylvain White
 2013: Pastorale, Oriane Polack
 2014: Les Trois Frères, le retour, Didier Bourdon et Bernard Campan
 2015: Dealer, Jean-Luc Herbulot
 2018: A Man in a Hurry, Hervé Mimran
 2018: Taarof- (SF), Alannah Olivia
 2018: Hope is French - (SF), Chris Mack
 2019 : Irréversible, Inversion Intégrale, Gaspar Noé

Television 

 2013: 15 jours ailleurs, Didier Bivel
 2014: L'Hôtel de la plage, saison 1, Christian Merret-Palmair
 2015: L'Hôtel de la plage, saison 2, Christian Merret-Palmair
 2015: Cherif, saison 3, Akim Isker
 2016: Falco, saison 4, Chris Briant
 2016: Legends, Alrick Riley
 2017: Vous les femmes, saison 5, Shaun Severi
 2017: Hidden, Sarah Pearce
2017: Joséphine, ange gardien: Dr Bourgon
 2018: The Team season 2, Kasper Gaardsøe - Jannik Johansen
 2018: On va s'aimer un peu, beaucoup..., Julien Zidi
 2018: Illegals, Nielegalni, season 1, Jan P. Matuszynski
 2019: Munch, saison 3, Laurent Tuel
 2019: Les Bracelets rouges, saison 3, Jeremy Manguy
 2020: Les Mystères de la chorale, Emmanuelle Dubergey
 2021: Jack Ryan, Alik Sakharov
 2021: Noël à tous les étages, Gilles Paquet-Brenner
 TBA: Hijack, Jim Field Smith

Theatre 

2008: The Vagina Monologues Eve Ensler – Dominique Deschamps
2006: Theatre for animals Clément Labail
2006: Simply the best Clément Labail
1998: The Diary of Frida Kahlo Frida Kahlo – Franck Darras
1998: Andromaque  Racine, – Franck Darras
1990: Le Pese-Nerfs Antonin Artaud, – Yvan Caillat

Radio 
 2018: A Tale of two cities: Aleppo and London, BBC drama series, Polly Thomas
 2018:  Riot Girls: Into The Maze, BBC drama series, Emma Harding
 2019: Oliver, BBC drama series, Ayeesha Menon – Michael Buffong
 2020: French like Faiza, BBC 3, Nicolas Jackson

External links 

French film actresses
Living people
Actresses from Lyon
University of Paris alumni
French people of Moroccan descent
French stage actresses
21st-century French actresses
Year of birth missing (living people)
French expatriates in the United Kingdom